France competed at the 1964 Summer Olympics in Tokyo, Japan. 138 competitors, 118 men and 20 women, took part in 89 events in 14 sports.

Medalists

Gold
 Pierre Jonquères d'Oriola — Equestrian, Jumping Individual Competition

Silver
 Maryvonne Dupureur — Athletics, Women's 800 metres
 Joseph Gonzales — Boxing, Men's Light Middleweight
 Jean Boudehen and Michel Chapuis — Canoeing, Men's C2 1000 m Canadian Pairs
 Pierre Jonquères d'Oriola, Janou Lefebvre, and Guy Lefrant — Equestrian, Jumping Team Competition
 Jean-Claude Magnan — Fencing, Men's Foil Individual
 Claude Arabo — Fencing, Men's Sabre Individual
 Jean-Claude Darouy, Georges Morel, and Jacques Morel — Rowing, Men's Coxed Pairs
 Kiki Caron — Swimming, Women's 100 m Backstroke

Bronze
 Paul Genevay, Bernard Laidebeur, Claude Piquemal, and Jocelyn Delecour — Athletics, Men's 4x100 metres Relay
 Daniel Morelon — Cycling, Men's 1000 m Sprint (Scratch)
 Pierre Trentin — Cycling, Men's 1000 m Time Trial
 Daniel Revenu — Fencing, Men's Foil Individual
 Jacky Courtillat, Jean-Claude Magnan, Christian Noël,  Daniel Revenu, and Pierre Rodocanachi — Fencing, Men's Foil Team
 Claude Bourquard, Claude Brodin, Jacques Brodin, Yves Dreyfus, and Jack Guittet — Fencing, Men's Épée Team

Athletics

Men's 4x100 metres Relay
 Paul Genevay, Bernard Laidebeur, Claude Piquemal, and Jocelyn Delecour → Bronze Medal

Boxing

Canoeing

Cycling

14 cyclists represented France in 1964.

 Individual road race
 Francis Bazire
 Lucien Aimar
 Bernard Guyot
 Christian Raymond

 Team time trial
 Marcel-Ernest Bidault
 Georges Chappe
 André Desvages
 Jean-Claude Wuillemin

 Sprint
 Daniel Morelon
 Pierre Trentin

 1000m time trial
 Pierre Trentin

 Tandem
 Daniel Morelon
 Pierre Trentin

 Individual pursuit
 Robert Varga

 Team pursuit
 Robert Varga
 Christian Cuch
 Joseph Pare
 Jacques Suire

Equestrian

Fencing

20 fencers, 15 men and 5 women, represented France in 1964.

 Men's foil
 Jean-Claude Magnan
 Daniel Revenu
 Jacky Courtillat

 Men's team foil
 Jean-Claude Magnan, Daniel Revenu, Jacky Courtillat, Pierre Rodocanachi, Christian Noël

 Men's épée
 Claude Bourquard
 Jack Guittet
 Yves Dreyfus

 Men's team épée
 Claude Brodin, Yves Dreyfus, Claude Bourquard, Jack Guittet, Jacques Brodin

 Men's sabre
 Claude Arabo
 Marcel Parent
 Jacques Lefèvre

 Men's team sabre
 Jean-Ernest Ramez, Jacques Lefèvre, Claude Arabo, Marcel Parent, Robert Fraisse

 Women's foil
 Cathérine Rousselet-Ceretti
 Brigitte Gapais-Dumont
 Annick Level

 Women's team foil
 Cathérine Rousselet-Ceretti, Marie-Chantal Depetris-Demaille, Brigitte Gapais-Dumont, Annick Level, Colette Revenu

Gymnastics

Judo

Rowing

France had 22 male rowers participate in five rowing events in 1960.

 Men's double sculls – 6th place
 René Duhamel, Bernard Monnereau

 Men's coxed pair – 2nd place ( Silver medal)
 Jacques Morel, Georges Morel, Jean-Claude Darouy

 Men's coxless four – 10th place
 Jean-Pierre Drivet, Roger Chatelain, Philippe Malivoire, Émile Clerc

 Men's coxed four – 4th place
 Yves Fraisse, Claude Pache, Gérard Jacquesson, Michel Dumas, Jean-Claude Darouy

 Men's eight – 7th place
 André Fevret, Pierre Maddaloni, André Sloth, Joseph Moroni, Robert Dumontois, Jean-Pierre Grimaud, Bernard Meynadier, Michel Viaud, Alain Bouffard

Sailing

Shooting

Four shooters represented France in 1964.

25 m pistol
 Jean Renaux

50 m pistol
 Jean Renaux

50 m rifle, prone
 Pierre Guy

Trap
 Claude Foussier
 Michel Prévost

Swimming

Weightlifting

Wrestling

References

External links
 Official Olympic Reports
 International Olympic Committee results database

Nations at the 1964 Summer Olympics
1964
Summer Olympics